Sofia Church is a church building in western Jönköping in Sweden. Belonging to Sofia-Järstorp Parish of the Church of Sweden, it was opened on 8 April 1888, on Octave of Easter.

References

External links

Churches in Jönköping
19th-century Church of Sweden church buildings
Churches completed in 1888
Churches in the Diocese of Växjö
Gothic Revival church buildings in Sweden